Harry Mills may refer to:

 Brusher Mills (Harry  Mills, 1840–1905), English hermit and snake catcher
 Harry Mills (politician) (1874–1959), Canadian locomotive engineer and politician
 Harry Flood Mills (1913–1982), singer with the Mills Brothers
 Harry Mills (footballer) (1922–1990), former professional footballer

See also
 Henry Mills (disambiguation)